The Costello School is an 11–16 mixed secondary school with academy status in Basingstoke, Hampshire, England.

It originally opened as Basingstoke High School for girls. It became Harriet Costello Secondary School in 1972 when it became a co-ed, but was renamed Costello Technology College after gaining specialist Technology College status. The school was converted to academy status on 1 July 2012 and was renamed The Costello School. Before becoming an academy it was a community school under the direct control of Hampshire County Council. The school continues to coordinate with Hampshire County Council for admissions. The school, as of 1 September 2018, is now part of the multi-academy trust (MAT) Bohunt Education Trust.

Notable alumni 
 Elizabeth Hurley, actress
 Tom Rees, ex-England rugby union footballer

References

External links 
 

Secondary schools in Hampshire
Academies in Hampshire